The spy hocicudo (Oxymycterus delator)  is a species of rodent in the family Cricetidae.
It is found only in Paraguay.

References

 Baillie, J. 1996.  Oxymycterus delator.   2006 IUCN Red List of Threatened Species.   Downloaded on 19 July 2007.
Musser, G. G. and M. D. Carleton. 2005. Superfamily Muroidea. pp. 894–1531 in Mammal Species of the World a Taxonomic and Geographic Reference. D. E. Wilson and D. M. Reeder eds. Johns Hopkins University Press, Baltimore.

Oxymycterus
Mammals described in 1903
Taxa named by Oldfield Thomas
Taxonomy articles created by Polbot